Aydın İlter (1 July 1930 – 21 April 2022) was a Turkish general. He was General Commander of the Gendarmerie of Turkey (1993 – 1995) and previously served in the Special Warfare Department from 1963 to 1983, including as head of the Department from 1980 to 1983.

References 

1930 births
2022 deaths
People from İzmir
Turkish Army generals
General Commanders of the Gendarmerie of Turkey
Special Warfare Department personnel
Kuleli Military High School alumni
Turkish Military Academy alumni